Llewelyn Davies is the formal surname of the family whose boys inspired J. M. Barrie to create the characters of Peter Pan and the Lost Boys:
Llewelyn Davies, Arthur, father of the boys
Llewelyn Davies, Sylvia, mother of the boys

The boys, in order of birth:
Llewelyn Davies, George
Llewelyn Davies, Jack
Llewelyn Davies, Peter
Llewelyn Davies, Michael
Llewelyn Davies, Nico

Other people
 Llewellyn Davies (1894–1965), English cricketer 
 Llewelyn Davies (footballer) (1881–1961) was a Wrexham A.F.C. and Wales international footballer
 Llewelyn Davies (aviator) (1898-1918) was a World War I flying ace; see List of World War I aces credited with 5 victories
 Richard Llewelyn-Davies, Baron Llewelyn-Davies (1912–1981) was a British architect and a cousin of the boys.
 Moya Llewelyn-Davies  (1881-1943) Richard's mother.

See also
Llewelyn Davies boys